Abbou is an Algerian surname, found in France as Abbou (from Hassaniya-Arabic ﻋﺒﻮ). Notable people with the surname include:

Jelena Abbou (born 1977), American figure competitor
Mohamed Abbou (Moroccan politician), born 1959
Mohamed Ait Abbou (born 1985), Moroccan footballer